The following is a list of superheroines (female superheroes) in comic books, television, film, and other media. Each character's name is followed by the publisher's name in parentheses; those from television or movies have their program listed in square brackets, and those in both comic books and other media appear in parentheses. .

A

Alisha (Misfits)
(Miraculous: Tales of Ladybug & Cat Noir)
Amber (Eclipse Comics)
America Chavez (Marvel Comics)
American Dream (Marvel Comics - MC2)
American Maid (The Tick)
Amethyst, Princess of Gemworld (DC Comics)
Andromeda (DC Comics)
Andromeda (Marvel Comics)
Angela (Image Comics) + (Marvel Comics)
Aquagirl (DC Comics)
Argent (DC Comics)
Arisia, the Green Lantern of Graxos IV (DC Comics)
Arrowette (DC Comics)
Artemis of Bana-Mighdall (DC Comics)
Atom Eve (Image Comics)
Atomic Betty (television series' title character)
Aurora (Marvel Comics)
Avengelyne (various)

B
B.Orchid (Killer Instinct)
 Ballistic (Cyberforce member; Top Cow)
Barb Wire (Dark Horse)
Batgirl (DC Comics)
Batwoman (DC Comics)
Beautiful Dreamer (DC Comics)
Bella Donna (Marvel Comics)
Belphegor (DC Comics)
 Betsy Braddock (Psylocke)/Captain Britain (Marvel Comics)
Claire Bennet (Heroes)
Big Barda (Comics)
Big Bertha (Marvel Comics)
Binary (Marvel Comics)
Vera Black (a.k.a. Sister Superior; DC Comics)
Black Canary (DC Comics)
Black Cat (Harvey Comics)
Black Cat (Marvel Comics)
Black Orchid (DC Comics)
Black Widow (Natasha Romanoff)
Black Widow (Timely Comics)
Blackbat (DC Comics)
Blacklight (Marvel Comics - MC2)
Blink (Marvel Comics)
Blossom (The Powerpuff Girls)
Bloom (Winx Club)
Bluebird (DC Comics)
Bluestreak (Marvel Comics - MC2)
Boodikka (Green Lantern Corps; DC Comics)
Boom Boom (Marvel Comics)
Brandy (Image Comics)
Bubbles (The Powerpuff Girls)
Buff (Marvel Comics)
Bulleteer (DC Comics)
 Bulletgirl (see Bulletman and Bulletgirl; DC Comics)
Bumblebee (DC Comics)
Burka Avenger
Burnout (Eclipse Comics)
Buttercup (The Powerpuff Girls)

C
Callisto (Marvel Comics)
Cambria (The Amory Wars)
Captain Britain (Betsy Braddock) (Marvel Comics)
Captain Confederacy (Marvel Comics)
Captain Marvel (Marvel Comics)
Captain Universe (Marvel Comics)
The Cat (Marvel Comics)
Cat Claw (Malibu Comics)
Catwoman (DC Comics)
Celsius (DC Comics)
Cerise (Marvel Comics)
Chance (Marvel Comics)
Chase (DC Comics)
Chastity (Chaos Comics)
Choice (Marvel - Ultraverse)
Cimarron (Eclipse Comics)
Cinnamon (DC Comics)
Clea (Marvel Comics)
Coagula (DC Comics)
Cobweb (America's Best Comics)
Colt (AC Comics)
Comet Queen (DC Comics, Legion of Super-Heroes)
Copycat (DC Comics - Wildstorm)
Copycat (Marvel Comics)
Anya Corazon (Marvel Comics)
Cornelia Hale (W.I.T.C.H.)
Crazy Jane (DC Comics)
Crimson Avenger III (DC Comics)
Crimson Curse (Marvel Comics - MC2)
Crimson Fox (DC Comics)
Crystal (Marvel Comics)
Cyberella (title character) (Helix comics)
Cybergirl (title character)
Cybersix
Cyblade (Top Cow)
Cyclone (DC Comics)

D
Dabung Girl (Deeper Learning Comics)
Dagger (Marvel Comics)
Darkstar (Marvel Comics)
Darna (Mango Comics)
Dart (DC Comics)
Dart (Image Comics - Highbrow Ent)
Dawn (Sirius Entertainment)
Dawnstar (DC Comics)
Dazzler (Marvel Comics)
Dead Girl (Marvel Comics)
Karolina Dean (Marvel Comics)
Debrii (Marvel Comics)
Deep Blue (DC Comics)
Destiny (Marvel Comics)
Devi (Virgin Comics)
Diamond Lil (Marvel Comics)
Diamondback (Marvel Comics)
Diva (DC Comics - Wildstorm)
Doctor Light (DC Comics)
Doctor Midnight (DC Comics)
Doll Girl (DC Comics)
Dolphin (DC Comics)
Domino (Marvel Comics)
Domino Lady (Pulps)
Dove as Dawn Granger (DC Comics)
Dragonfly (AC Comics)
Dragonna (Mars Ravelo's)
Dream Girl (DC Comics)
Dumb Bunny (DC Comics)
Dusk (Marvel Comics)
Dust (Marvel Comics)
Dyna Girl (Krofft)

E
Echo (Marvel Comics)
Elasti-Girl (DC Comics)
Elastigirl/Mrs.Incredible (The Incredibles)
Electra Woman (Krofft)
Elektra (Marvel Comics)
Empowered (Dark Horse Comics)
Empress (DC)
Emma Frost (Marvel Comics)
Energizer (from Power Pack; Marvel)
The Engineer II (DC - Wildstorm)

F
Fairchild (DC Comics - Wildstorm)
Faith (DC Comics)
Fallen Angel (DC Comics)
Fantômette (Collection Rose)
Fathom (one of the Elementals, Comico Comics)
Fathom (Aspen Comics)
Feral (Marvel)
Fever (DC Comics)
Fire (DC Comics)
Firebird (Marvel Comics)
Firestar (Marvel Comics)
Flamebird III-V (DC Comics)
Fleur-de-Lis (DC Comics)
Flint (WS)
Flora (Winx Club)
Forerunner (DC Comics)
Free Spirit (Marvel Comics)
Freefall (DC Comics - Wildstorm)
Tara Fremont (AC Comics)
Emma Frost (Marvel Comics)
Fury I (DC Comics)
Fury II (DC Comics)

G
Gamora (Marvel Comics)
Ganymede (Marvel Comics)
Garganta (AC Comics)
Ghost (Dark Horse Comics)
Glitter (Marvel - New Universe)
Glory (various)
Gloss (DC Comics)
Godiva (DC Comics)
Grace (DC Comics)
Jean Grey (Marvel Comics) 
Gabby Gomez/Gum Girl (Disney/Hyperion)
Gwen Tennyson (Ben 10)
Gypsy (DC Comics)

H
Halo (DC Comics)
Harbinger (DC Comics)
Hawk as Holly Granger and Sasha Martens (DC Comics)
Hawkeye (Kate Bishop) (Marvel Comics)
Hawkgirl (DC Comics)
Hawkwoman (DC Comics)
Molly Hayes (Marvel Comics)
Hay Lin (W.I.T.C.H.)
Hellcat (Marvel Comics)
Satana Hellstrom (Marvel Comics)
Hepzibah (Marvel Comics)
Hit Girl (Kick-Ass)
Horridus (Image Comics - Highbrow Ent)
Heather Hudson, formerly Sasquatch, Exiles member (Marvel Comics)
Huntara (Marvel Comics)
Huntress (DC Comics)
Husk (Marvel Comics)

I
Ice (DC Comics) 
Icemaiden (DC Comics)
Indigo (DC Comics), formerly Brainiac 8
Insect Queen (DC Comics)
Invisible Woman (Marvel Comics)
Natasha Irons (DC Comics)
Isis (DC Comics)
Irma Lair (W.I.T.C.H.)
Ironheart (Marvel Comics)

J
Jade (DC Comics)
Jann of the Jungle (Marvel Comics)
Jayna (DC Comics)
Jem and the Holograms (Hasbro)
Jess (Misfits)
Jet (DC Comics)
Jet (DC Comics - Wildstorm)
Jinx (DC Comics; Teen Titans TV series only)
Jocasta (Marvel Comics)
Daisy Johnson (Marvel Comics)
Jolt (Marvel Comics)
Jessica Jones (a.k.a. Jewel and Knightress; Marvel Comics)
Rhea Jones (a.k.a. Lodestone; DC Comics)
Joystick (Marvel Comics)
Jubilee (Marvel Comics)
Judomaster III (DC Comics)
Jungle Girl (various)

K
 Kagami (a.k.a. Ryuko) (Miraculous: Tales of Ladybug & Cat Noir)
Jennifer Kale (Marvel Comics)
Bette Kane (DC Comics)
Nova Kane (First)
Karma (Marvel Comics)
 Kasumi (a.k.a. Batgirl; Cassandra Cain; DC Comics)
Katana (DC Comics)
Kelly (Misfits)
Laurel Kent (DC Comics)
Kid Flash (Iris West) (DC Comics)
Kinetix (DC Comics)
Kismet (Marvel Comics)
Misty Knight (Marvel Comics)
Knockout (DC Comics)
Killer Frost (DC Comics)
Kole (DC Comics)
Kratha (Virgin Comics)
Krystala (ABS-CBN)

L
Lady Blackhawk (DC Comics)
Lady Deadpool (Marvel Comics)
Lady Death (Chaos Comics)
Lady Luck (The Spirit Section)
Ladybug (Miraculous: Tales of Ladybug & Cat Noir)
Ladyhawk (Marvel Comics)
Liberty Belle (DC Comics)
Lightning (DC Comics)
Lightning Lass (a.k.a. Light Lass, Gossamer, Spark; DC Comics)
Lightspeed (from Power Pack; Marvel Comics)
Little Mermaid (DC Comics)
Looker (DC Comics)
La Lunatica (Marvel Comics)
Lyja (a.k.a. Lazerfist and Ms. Fantastic; Marvel Comics; Marvel-MC2)

M
M (Marvel Comics)
Madame Mirage (Top Cow Productions)
Madame Xanadu (DC Comics)
The Magdalena (Top Cow Productions)
Magdalene (Marvel Comics)
Magik (Marvel Comics)
Magma (Marvel Comics)
Manhunter (Kate Spencer) (DC Comics)
Manitou Dawn (DC Comics)
Marinette Dupain-Cheng (Miraculous: Tales of Ladybug & Cat Noir)
Marrina (Marvel Comics)
Marrow (Marvel Comics)
Marvel Girl (Marvel Comics)
Mary Marvel (DC Comics)
Aspen Matthews (Aspen Comics)
Maxima (DC Comics)
Maximum Ride (novel series and manga)
Maya (DC Comics)
Medusa (Marvel Comics)
Mega Mindy 
Meggan (Marvel Comics)
The Menagerie (DC Comics)
Mera (DC Comics)
Merry, Girl of 1000 Gimmicks (DC Comics)
Lynn Michaels (a.k.a. "Lady Punisher"; Marvel Comics)
Mighty B
Nico Minoru (Marvel Comics)
Mirage (DC Comics)
Miss America (DC Comics)
Miss America (Madeline Joyce) (Marvel Comics)
Miss Fury
Miss Martian (DC Comics)
Mockingbird (Marvel Comics)
Monstress (DC Comics)
Moondragon (Marvel Comics)
Moonstar (Marvel Comics)
Moonstone (Marvel Comics)
Motormouth (Marvel Comics)
Ms. Marvel (Carol Danvers; see also Binary and Warbird; Marvel Comics)
Ms. Marvel (Kamala Khan) (Marvel Comics)
Ms. Marvel (Sharon Ventura; see also She-Thing; Marvel Comics)
Ms. Mystic (originally Pacific Comics, then Continuity Comics)
Ms. Victory
Musa (Winx Club)
Mystique (Marvel Comics)

N
Namora (Marvel Comics)
Namorita (Marvel Comics)
Natalie Gooch (Disney/Hyperion)
Negative Woman (DC Comics)
Nelvana of the Northern Lights (Hillborough Studio)
Nemesis (Marvel Comics)
Nemesis II (DC Comics)
Night Girl (DC Comics)
Night Nurse (Marvel Comics)
Nightshade (DC Comics)
Nightstar (DC Comics)
Nightveil (AC comics)
Nikki (Marvel Comics)
Nimona (HarperCollins)
Ninja-Rina (Disney/Hyperion)
Nocturne (Marvel Comics)
Nova (Frankie Raye) (Marvel Comics)
Number Seven / The White Violin (Vanya Hargreeves) (The Umbrella Academy)
Number Three / The Rumor (Allison Hargreeves) (The Umbrella Academy)

O
Octobriana
Aleta Ogord (see also Starhawk; Marvel Comics)
Scarlet O'Neil (Newspaper Strip)
Onyx (DC Comics)
Oracle (DC Comics)
Owlwoman (DC Comics)

P
Pantha (DC Comics)
Violet Parr (The Incredibles)
Penance (Marvel Comics)
Sara Pezzini (Witchblade; Top Cow)
Phantom Girl a.k.a. Apparition (DC Comics)
Phantom Lady
Phoenix (Marvel Comics)
Photon (Marvel Comics)
Pixie (Marvel Comics)
Poison Ivy (Batman comic series)
Polaris (as Overdrive; Marvel Comics)
Power Girl (DC Comics)
Power Princess (Marvel Comics)
Princess Projectra a.k.a. Sensor (DC Comics)
Promethea (America's Best Comics)
Purple Flame (Deeper Learning Comics)
Kitty Pryde (Marvel Comics)
Psylocke (Kwannon) (Marvel Comics)

Q
Jenny Quantum (DC Comics - Wildstorm)
Queen Hippolyta (DC Comics)
Jesse Quick (DC Comics)

R
Rad (AC Comics)
Rainbow (Eclipse Comics)
Rainbow Brite (Hallmark Comics)
Rampage (DC Comics)
Raptor (Marvel Comics - MC2)
Raven (DC Comics)
Red Guardian (Marvel Comics)
Red She-Hulk (Marvel Comics)
Red Tornado (All-American Comics)
Rescue (Marvel Comics)
Revanche (Marvel Comics)
Cecilia Reyes (Marvel Comics)
Robin as Stephanie Brown or Carrie Kelley
Rocket (DC Comics)
Rogue (Marvel Comics)
Ronin (Marvel Comics)
Rose and Thorn II (DC Comics)
Rose Tattoo (DC Comics - Wildstorm)
Roxy (Winx Club)
 Ryuko (Miraculous: Tales of Ladybug & Cat Noir)

S
Sabra (Marvel Comics)
Sage (Marvel Comics)
Sailor Moon (Kodansha manga)
Saturn Girl (DC Comics)
Savant (DC Comics - Wildstorm)
Scarlet Witch (Marvel Comics)
Scorpion (Carmilla Black) (Marvel Comics)
Secret (DC Comics)
Amanda Sefton (Marvel Comics)
Selene (Underworld)
Sepulchre (Marvel Comics)
Sersi (Marvel Comics)
Shadow Hunter (Virgin Comics)
Shadow Lass a.k.a. Umbra (DC Comics)
Shadowcat (Marvel Comics)
Shadoweyes (SLG Publishing)
Shadowhawk (Image Comics)
Shakti (Raj Comics)
Shamrock (Marvel Comics)
Shanna the She-Devil (Marvel Comics)
She-Dragon (Image Comics - Highbrow Ent)
She-Hulk (Marvel Comics)
She-Hulk (Lyra) (Marvel Comics)
She-Ra (television series)
She-Thing (Marvel Comics)
She-Venom (Marvel Comics)
Sheena (Wags)
Liz Sherman (Dark Horse, Hellboy)
SheZow (television series)
Shi (Crusade)
Shikari (DC Comics)
Shining Knight (Ystina) (DC Comics)
Shrinking Violet (DC Comics)
Sif (Marvel Comics)
Silhouette (Marvel Comics)
Silk (Marvel Comics)
Silk Spectre (DC Comics)
Silver Fox (Marvel Comics)
Silver Sable (Marvel Comics)
Silver Scorpion
Silverclaw (Marvel Comics)
Siryn (Marvel Comics)
Skids (Marvel Comics)
Skyrocket (DC Comics)
Snowbird (Marvel Comics)
Songbird (Marvel Comics)
Emma Sonnett (a.k.a. the 10th Muse) (various)
Jenny Sparks (DC Comics - Wildstorm)
Sparx (DC Comics)
Speedy (Mia Dearden) (DC Comics)
Spider Girl (DC Comics)
Spider-Girl (Marvel Comics - MC2)
Spider-Gwen (Marvel Comics)
Spider-Woman (Marvel Comics)
Dorothy Spinner (DC Comics)
Spitfire (Marvel Comics)
Spoiler (DC Comics)
Spy Smasher (Katarina Armstrong; DC Comics)
Squirrel Girl (Marvel Comics)
Stacy X (Marvel Comics)
Star Sapphire (DC Comics)
Star-Spangled Kid (DC Comics)
Stardust (AC Comics)
Starfire (DC Comics)
Stargirl (DC Comics)
Stature (Marvel Comics)
Stella (Winx Club)
Stepford Cuckoos (Marvel Comics)
Stinger (Cassandra Lang; Marvel Comics - MC2)
Storm (Marvel Comics)
Stripperella
Sun Girl (Marvel Comics)
Super Gran (TV series)
SuperAvni (Deeper Learning Comics)
Supergirl (DC Comics)
Superwoman (DC Comics)
Suprema (Awesome)
Surge (Marvel)
Swift (DC Comics - Wildstorm)

T
Talisman (Alpha Flight) (Marvel Comics)
Tara (Marvel Comics)
Taranee Cook (W.I.T.C.H.)
Tecna (Winx Club)
Terra (DC Comics, Teen Titans)
Thor (comics) (Marvel Comics) as Jane Foster (comics) 
Thor Girl (Marvel Comics)
Thunder III (DC Comics)
Thunder (DC Comics)
Jonni Thunder (DC Comics)
Thundra (Marvel Comics)
Tigra (Marvel Comics)
Timeslip (Marvel Comics)
Titaness (Mansion Comics)
Topaz (Malibu Comics)
Topaz (Marvel Comics)
Touriya Naji (sarcasm comics)
Traci 13 (DC Comics)
Triplicate Girl a.k.a. Duo Damsel, Triad (DC Comics)
Troia (DC Comics)
Donna Troy (DC Comics)
Tsunami (DC Comics)
Katma Tui a.k.a. Green Lantern of Sector 1417 (DC Comics)
Turbo (Marvel Comics)

V
Valda the Iron Maiden (DC Comics)
Valkyrie (Marvel Comics)
Vampirella (Dynamite Entertainment)
Varga (Bulaklak Magazine)
Velocity (Top Cow: Cyberforce)
Venus (Marvel Comics)
Vigilante (Patricia Tryce; DC Comics)
Vindicator (Marvel Comics)
Vixen (DC Comics)
Vogue (various)
Void (DC Comics - Wildstorm)
Voodoo (DC Comics - Wildstorm: WildCats)

W
Jakita Wagner (DC Comics - Wildstorm: Planetary)
Jenny "XJ-9" Wakeman (My Life as a Teenage Robot)
Wallflower (Marvel Comics)
The Wasp (Marvel Comics)
Wave (a.k.a. Pearl Pangan; Marvel Comics' The New Agents of Atlas)
Web Woman (Filmation)
WhirlGirl (Web series title character)
The White Witch (DC Comics)
Wild Thing (Marvel Comics - MC2)
Wilhelmina "Will" Vandom (W.I.T.C.H.)
WilyKit (Thundercats)
Wind Dancer (Marvel Comics)
Colleen Wing (Marvel Comics)
Winged Victory (Astro City)
Witchblade (Top Cow Productions)
Witchfire (DC Comics)
Witchfire (Marvel Comics)
Wolfsbane (Marvel Comics)
The Woman in Red (Standard Comics)
Wonder Girl (DC Comics)
Wonder Girl (Cassie Sandsmark) (DC Comics)
Wonder Twins (DC Comics)
Wonder Woman (DC Comics)
 Wonder Woman (Just Imagine...; DC Comics)
WordGirl (television series' title character)

X
X-23 (Marvel Comics)
Xena Warrior Princess (Darkhorse Comics)
XJ-9 (see Jenny "XJ-9" Wakeman) 
XS (DC Comics)

Y
Gertrude Yorkes (Marvel Comics)
Vesperia (Miraculous: Tales of Ladybug & Cat Noir)

Z
Zatanna (DC Comics)
Zealot (DC Comics - Wildstorm)
Zoe lee (Miraculous: Tales of Ladybug & Cat Noir)

See also
Girl Heroes'''
List of female supervillains
List of woman warriors in folklore, literature and popular culture
Magical girl
Portrayal of women in American comics
Superheroine

References

External links

 
 Fes|Superheroines
Superheroines